The Italy men's national field hockey team represents Italy in international field hockey competitions.

Tournament record

Summer Olympics
1952 – 11th place
1960 – 13th place

World Cup
1978 – 13th place

EuroHockey Championship
1970 – 13th place
1974 – 12th place
1987 – 9th place
1991 – 12th place
1999 – 12th place
2003 – 10th place

EuroHockey Championship II
2005 – 5th place
2007 – 6th place
2009 – 7th place
2013 – 8th place
2019 – 5th place
2021 – 5th place

EuroHockey Championship III
2011 – 
2015 – 
2017 –

Hockey World League
2012–13 – Round 1
2014–15 – 29th place
2016–17 – 31st place

FIH Hockey Series
2018–19 – Second round

Players

Current squad
The following 18 players were named on 19 August 2022 for the 2022 EuroHockey Championship Qualifier in Vienna, Austria from 23 to 26 August 2022.

Caps updated as of 26 August 2022, after the match against Ukraine.

Recent call-ups
The following players have been selected in the past 12 months and are still eligible to represent.

See also
Italy women's national field hockey team

References

European men's national field hockey teams
national team
Field hockey